Penicillium terrigenum is a species of fungus in the genus Penicillium which was isolated from soil in Hawaii in the United States.

References 

terrigenum
Fungi described in 2011